Stanislav Lobotka (born 25 November 1994) is a Slovak professional footballer who plays as a midfielder for Serie A club Napoli and the Slovakia national team.

Club career

AS Trenčín
Lobotka made his Corgoň Liga debut for AS Trenčín against FK Dukla Banská Bystrica on 4 March 2012.

Ajax (loan)
Lobotka joined AFC Ajax for the 2013–14 season on 30 June 2013 on a one-year loan with option to buy. He played his first match for Ajax on 13 July 2013 in a pre-season friendly encounter against RKC Waalwijk. He came on as a 60th minute substitute for Christian Eriksen in the 5–1 win in Waalwijk at the Mandemakers Stadion.

Nordsjælland
Stanislav Lobotka came to FC Nordsjælland in August shortly before the transfer window closed, and made his debut against Brøndby on 30 August 2015. 
Lobotka entered as a regular on the midfield, and in his first season has played all the matches except for one because of illness.

The 21-year-old Slovak was voted player of the year in his first season at the FCN Awards.
In 2017, he was again voted club's player of the year after another great season.

Celta Vigo
On 15 July 2017, Lobotka joined Celta on a five-year deal.

On 3 June 2019, Lobotka admitted that after Celta's unsuccessful season, he was open to a transfer, looking to find a club set to play in European competitions next season. According to Pravda he also claimed, that he was aware of an interest from other Spanish and German clubs.

Napoli 
On 15 January 2020, Lobotka signed to Italian Serie A club S.S.C. Napoli, for a reported €24m deal until 2024.

Lobotka was benched in his first possible fixture against Fiorentina, on 18 January 2020, in a 0–2 defeat. Instead, Lobotka made a brief, 22 minute appearance in Coppa Italia against Lazio, being featured in the starting line-up. He had to be replaced early due to tactical changes, following a red card to Elseid Hysaj. Still, Lobotka witnessed an early winning goal by Lorenzo Insigne in the 2nd minute.

He made his league debut against table-leaders Juventus on 26 January 2020. Lobotka came on as a replacement for Diego Demme, who was booked with a yellow card in the first half. Napoli managed to earn an upset victory over the favourites, by winning 2–1, with goals scored by Piotr Zieliński and Lorenzo Insigne. Cristiano Ronaldo's stoppage time goal did not change the result. He had his first league start in the next round, in a 4–2 away victory at Stadio Luigi Ferraris against Sampdoria. Lobotka played for over an hour and was replaced by Diego Demme, as Napoli led 2–1, after goals by Arkadiusz Milik and Elif Elmas. Demme went on to score the third goal and Dries Mertens sealed the win in stoppage time.

Lobotka had also been added to Napoli's UEFA Champions League squad, thus making him eligible to participate in the Round of 16 fixtures against Barcelona. The first competitive set of fixtures between the clubs was also dubbed, by some, the Maradona derby.

International career
Lobotka represented various youth Slovak teams, and in November 2016 he was called up to the senior Slovakia squad for matches against Lithuania and Austria. He made his debut in the latter friendly match, on 15 November 2016, along with other debuting players, Matúš Bero and Albert Rusnák. He played in the second half of the goalless draw.

He was then called up to multiple fixtures but had to wait for his competitive debut until 1 September 2017, for a 2018 FIFA World Cup qualifier against Slovenia. He played the entire match being a valuable midfielder, fulfilling the expectations following the successful performances of Lobotka and Slovakia U21 at the 2017 UEFA European Under-21 Championship, as well as his move to Celta Vigo. His performance contributed to Slovakia's 1-0 home win and he was dubbed the 'Man of The Match' by media and the fans.

Only three days later, on 4 September 2017, Lobotka scored his first international goal for the senior team and became the first Slovak to score at Wembley, in a qualifier against England. He scored after he tackled and took the ball from Marcus Rashford and exchanged a pass with Adam Nemec, before beating Joe Hart in the 3rd minute of the match. Slovakia however went on to lose the game 1-2, after goals by Eric Dier and Rashford. The 8th game of the campaign was a direct battle for the 1st place in qualifying Group F. Similarly, like after the previous game, Lobotka received praise for his performance. By the end of the year, he scored again in a friendly match against Norway in the 93rd minute, providing Slovakia a 1-0 victory in a final international game of Ján Ďurica.

Career statistics

Club

International

International goals
Slovakia's score listed first, score column indicates score after each Lobotka goal.

Honours
AS Trenčín
Fortuna Liga: 2014–15
Slovnaft Cup: 2014–15

Napoli
 Coppa Italia: 2019–20

Slovakia
King's Cup: 2018

References

External links
Stanislav Lobotka on S.S.C. Napoli
Corgoň Liga profile

1994 births
Living people
Sportspeople from Trenčín
Slovak footballers
Slovak expatriate footballers
Slovakia international footballers
Slovakia youth international footballers
Slovakia under-21 international footballers
Association football midfielders
AS Trenčín players
AFC Ajax players
FC Nordsjælland players
RC Celta de Vigo players
S.S.C. Napoli players
Slovak Super Liga players
Danish Superliga players
La Liga players
Serie A players
UEFA Euro 2020 players
Expatriate footballers in the Netherlands
Slovak expatriate sportspeople in the Netherlands
Expatriate men's footballers in Denmark
Slovak expatriate sportspeople in Denmark
Expatriate footballers in Spain
Slovak expatriate sportspeople in Spain
Expatriate footballers in Italy
Slovak expatriate sportspeople in Italy